Tomb KV33 is a non-royal tomb located in the Valley of the Kings in Egypt. It was discovered by Victor Loret in 1898 and was not fully cleared at the time of its discovery. The tomb site was eventually resealed for later detailed excavation.

References

External links
Theban Mapping Project: KV33 includes detailed maps of most of the tombs.

1898 archaeological discoveries
Valley of the Kings
Twenty-fifth Dynasty of Egypt
Twenty-sixth Dynasty of Egypt